Argyrophis klemmeri, also known as Klemmer's blind snake or the Kuala Lumpur worm snake, is a species of Asian snake in the family Typhlopidae.

Geographic range
A. klemmeri is found in western Malaysia.

Etymology
The specific name, klemmeri, is in honor of German herpetologist Konrad Klemmer.

Reproduction
A. klemmeri is oviparous.

References

Further reading
Taylor, Edward H. (1962). "New Oriental Reptiles". Univ. Kansas Sci. Bull. 43: 209–263. (Typhlops klemmeri, new species, pp. 253–254).
Hedges, Stephen B.; Marion, Angela B.; Lipp, Kelly M.; Marin, Julie; Vidal, Nicolas (2014). "A taxonomic framework for typhlopid snakes from the Caribbean and other regions (Reptilia, Squamata)". Caribbean Herpetology (49): 1-61. (Asiatyphlops klemmeri, new combination).
Pyron, Robert Alexander; Wallach, Van (2014). "Systematics of the blindsnakes (Serpentes: Scolecophidia: Typhlopoidea) based on molecular and morphological evidence". Zootaxa 3829 (1): 001–081. (Argyrophis klemmeri, new combination).

klemmeri
Snakes of Southeast Asia
Reptiles of the Malay Peninsula
Endemic fauna of Malaysia
Taxa named by Edward Harrison Taylor
Reptiles described in 1962